One is the debut studio album by Swedish recording group Kate Boy, released on 6 November 2015 by Iamsound Records.

Track listing

References 

2015 albums
Iamsound Records albums